Kash Qalman may refer to:
 Kash Qalman-e Bala
 Kash Qalman-e Pain